Batik Air Malaysia (formerly known as Malindo Air) is a Malaysian full service carrier, an associate carrier of Indonesian Lion Air Group, with headquarters in Petaling Jaya, Selangor, Malaysia. The original name Malindo signifies a cooperative pact between Malaysia and Indonesia.

Background
The entry of AirAsia from Malaysia into the home turf of Lion Air has encouraged the Indonesian airline to enter the Malaysian market with a subsidiary airline. AirAsia's subsidiary Indonesia AirAsia, in partnership with its parent firm, attempted to buy Indonesian carrier Batavia Air to gain a foothold in Indonesia, but the deal did not go through due to regulatory complications and Batavia Air ended up going bankrupt. The attempted deal resulted in a turf war between Lion Air, Indonesia's biggest low-cost carrier, and AirAsia, Asia's biggest low-cost carrier.

Mr. Chandran Rama Muthy, personal assistant executive to the president director of Lion Air, was appointed as CEO of Batik Air Malaysia. The airline's inaugural flights began operations on 22 March 2013.

For its jet routes, Batik Air Malaysia provides seat pitches of 32" and 45" for economy class and business class respectively, and free baggage allowances of 40 kg for Business passengers and either 20 kg or 30 kg for Economy class passengers depending on their ticket category. Economy passengers on flights to Shah Amanat International Airport and Shahjalal International Airport in Bangladesh receive a 35 kg baggage allowance. However, the airline's very cheapest Economy class tickets do not receive a free baggage allowance. In June 2015, Malindo became the first Malaysian airline to offer in-flight Wi-Fi service. The combination of the amenities, services and low cost fares puts Batik Air Malaysia in the category of hybrid airline.

The airline also has expanded on a parallel turboprop service, focusing mainly on secondary routes within a 2-hour radius from Sultan Abdul Aziz Shah Airport. Pioneer destinations include Penang, Johor Bahru and Kota Bharu, the flights have commenced in early June 2013.

In early 2017, the airline was expected to re-brand Malindo Air to "Batik Air Malaysia" which will focus on international routes while its associate airline, Batik Air serves domestic routes in Indonesia. The airline has begun to feature the Batik Air Malaysia logo and livery on its aircraft gradually.

In 2016 Malindo initiated interline agreements with Turkish Airlines, and Qatar Airways.

In February 2017, National Aerospace and Defence Industries (Nadi) reduced its stake from 50.99% to just 5%. Then-Chief Executive Officer Chandran Rama Muthy is now the major shareholder with his wife Kalpana Devasagayam now hold a 46% stake at the Malindo Air's operating company, Malindo Airways via Sky One Investors. They both own equal portions in Sky One. The remaining 49% of shares in Malindo is owned by the Indonesian PT Lion Group.

In April 2017, Malindo Air received its International Air Transport Association (IATA) certificate as IATA member. The airline has also successfully retained its IOSA registration, which is valid from 3 June 2018 to 3 June 2020.

On 22 May 2017, Malindo Air became the first airline in the world to introduce Boeing 737 MAX 8 into service. Configured in mono-class 180 Economy seats, the first commercial service departed from Kuala Lumpur to Singapore. However, the Boeing 737 MAX 8 service was short-lived as the airline received numerous customer complaints, especially from business class passengers having to downgrade to economy class. The sole B737-MAX 8 was returned to its parent company Lion Air.

In an official press release issued by Malindo Air dated 26 August 2019, Captain Mushafiz Mustafa Bakri, Director of Safety, Security & Quality of Thai Lion Air has been announced as the new CEO, replacing the current CEO effective 23 September 2019, while Chandra Rama Muthy to be appointed as Group Strategy Director, Lion Group.

On 23 October 2020, it was reported that Malindo Air had decided to cut more than half of its workforce as part of measures to mitigate the effects of Covid-19 on their business. With that, the hybrid full-service airline is said to have laid off about 2,200 employees or more than half of its 3,200 workforce.

On 28 April 2022, Malindo Air was rebranded as Batik Air Malaysia in line with the Lion Group's goal to establish a common identity for the full service airlines within the group. Following this, Boeing 737 MAX 8 was reintroduced into the fleet.

The Batik Air Malaysia Boeing 737 MAX 8 officially started its first flight with the airline on 2 June 2022 from Kuala Lumpur to Kota Kinabalu as OD1002.

Destinations

Batik Air Malaysia operates over 800 flights weekly across 57 routes in Malaysia and across the continents of Asia and Australia.

Codeshare agreements 
Batik Air Malaysia codeshares with the following airlines:

 Batik Air
 Turkish Airlines

Interline agreements 
Batik Air Malaysia have Interline agreements with the following airlines:

 All Nippon Airways
 Etihad Airways
 Oman Air
 Pakistan International Airlines
 Qatar Airways
 Turkish Airlines
 XiamenAir

Fleet

, Batik Air Malaysia operates the following aircraft:

Incidents and accidents
 19 April 2018 – A Malindo Air Boeing 737-900ER flying from Tribhuvan International Airport in Kathmandu to Kuala Lumpur overran the runway at Kathmandu after a high-speed rejected takeoff. The aircraft came to a stop in the grass 250 feet (75 metres) past the runway end. All 132 passengers and seven crew members escaped without injuries. Damage to the aircraft was minor and the airport was closed for 12 hours for it to be moved. The flight crew opted to abort the takeoff because of a warning indicating the aircraft was not correctly configured.
 On 20 June 2019, Malindo Air Flight 301, a Boeing 737-8GP(WL) (registration 9M-LCK) from Bandung to Kuala Lumpur, made a runway excursion at Husein Sastranegara International Airport shortly before takeoff. There were no fatalities.

References

External links

  https://www.batikair.com/

2012 establishments in Malaysia
Airlines of Malaysia
Lion Air
Airlines established in 2012
Malaysian brands
Privately held companies of Malaysia
Malaysian companies established in 2012